Mišković is a Serbian and Croatian surname, derived from the male given name Miško (in Serbo-Croatian, it is derived from the word Mišić, which means "small mouse"). It is borne by ethnic Serbs and Croats (Imotica and Pag). It may refer to:

 Dejan Mišković (footballer) (born 1985), Croatian footballer
 Dejan Mišković (basketball) (born 1974), Serbian former basketball player
 Miroslav Mišković (born 1945), Serbian businessman
 Milorad Mišković (born 1928), Serbian choreographer
 Nenad Mišković, Bosnian Serb footballer
 Nikola Mišković, (born 1999), Serbian basketball player
 Slobodan Mišković (born 1944), Yugoslav handball player
 Snežana Mišković "Viktorija", Serbian female rock singer
 Peter Miscovich, Croatian inventor
 John Miscovich, Croatian-American inventor
 Jakub “AstralKid22” Miškovič, Slovakian artist/rapper

See also 
 Mišović
 Mirković

Serbian surnames
Croatian surnames
Patronymic surnames
Surnames from given names

sr:Мишковић